HMS H43 was a British H class submarine built by Armstrong Whitworth, Newcastle Upon Tyne. She was laid down on 4 October 1917 and was commissioned on 25 November 1919. It had a complement of twenty-two crew members.

HMS H43 was one of the seven H class submarines to survive to the end of World War II . HMS H43 was sold in November 1944 and was scrapped in Troon in 1945.

Design

H43 was fitted with an anti-aircraft gun and four  torpedo tubes. Its torpedo tubes were fitted to the bows and the submarine was loaded with eight  torpedoes. It is a Holland 602 type submarine but was designed to meet Royal Navy specifications. Its complement was twenty-two crew members.

Operational use
 July 1940 delivered Lt. Hubert Nicholle to German occupied Guernsey to undertake a reconnaissance and successfully recovered him 3 days later. Commanded by Lt Colvin.

See also
 List of submarines of the Second World War

References

Bibliography
 

 

British H-class submarines
Ships built on the River Tyne
1919 ships
World War II submarines of the United Kingdom
Royal Navy ship names
Ships built by Armstrong Whitworth